Abidjan Basket Club Fighters, commonly known as ABC Fighters, is an Ivorian basketball club based in the city of Abidjan. Founded in 1997, the team is the most successful men teams in the country, with 19 national championships won, and one continental FIBA Africa Champions Cup in 2005. The home arena of the team is the Palais des Sports de Treichville.

History
The ABC club was established in 1997 by members of the basketball section of the Africa Sports d'Abidjan football club. In 2002, the team played in the FIBA Africa Club Champions Cup for the first time. In 2004, the first-ever Ivorian Basketball Championship was won.

In 2005, ABC won the FIBA Africa Clubs Champions Cup and was crowned African champions for the first time. In the final, ABC beat Angolan club Interclube 67–66. Stéphane Konaté was named the competition's Most Valuable Player.

In 2021, the team was re-named from ABC to ABC Fighters. The team is nicknamed Dangôrôs, a term that designates in Malinké those who have earned the respect devolved to the elders.

On 18 November 2022, ABC defeated Stade Malien in the Road to BAL semi-finals and clinched their first-ever ticket to the Basketball Africa League (BAL).

Honours

Domestic
Ivorian Basketball Championship
Champions (20): 2004, 2005, 2006, 2007, 2008, 2009, 2010, 2011, 2012, 2013, 2014, 2015, 2016, 2017, 2019, 2020, 2022
Ivorian CupChampions (12): 2004, 2005, 2006, 2008, 2010, 2012, 2013, 2014, 2015, 2016, 2018, 2019Ivorian SuperCupChampions (2): 2005, 2006
InternationalFIBA Africa Clubs Champions CupWinners (1): 2005

In African competitionsFIBA Africa Clubs Champions Cup  (7 appearances)

2002 – 5th Place
2004 – Runners-up 
2005 – Champions 

2006 – 6th Place
2007 – 3rd Place 

2012 – 8th Place
2014 – 11th PlaceBAL Qualifiers' (1 appearance)
2020 – Second Round

Players

Current rosterAs of 26 February 2023.''

Head coach:  Liz Mills

Notable players

 Stéphane Konaté
 Abraham Sie

Head coaches
  Franck Sylva
  Liz Mills: (2023–present)

References

External links
Official website
Abidjan Basket Club on Facebook

Basketball teams in Ivory Coast
Road to BAL teams
Sport in Abidjan
Basketball teams established in 1997